(In this last of nights), WAB 17, is a motet composed by Anton Bruckner.

History 

However, it is not known whether it was performed at that time. It was edited first by Anton Böhm & Sohn, Augsburg & Vienna, 1931.

There are two settings: one for soloist and organ, and another for mixed choir a cappella. The manuscript of the setting for soloist and organ is stored in the archive of the city museum of Wels. A transcription of the other setting is found in the Österreichische Nationalbibliothek.

Text 
The text is the first strophe of a 13-strophe text coming from the devoutness book Die heilige Passion, gefeiert in Liedern, Betrachtungen und Gebeten.<ref>Die heilige Passion, gefeiert in Liedern, Betrachtungen und Gebeten, Christlicher Verein im nordlichen Deutschland (Ed.), Band 1, Halle, 1840, pp. 63-65</ref>

{|
|
|style="padding-left:2em;"|In this last of nights
When I prayed at the Mount of Olives,
I was reddened from blood sweat,
Poured it streaming for thee.
Woe! And who knows if ever
you even think of me!
|}

In addition, a transcription using the Latin text In monte oliveti has been published by Theodor Bernhard Rehmann, Edition Peters, Leipzig, 1947.

{|
|
|style="padding-left:2em;"|On the Mount of Olives
He prayed to the Father:
"Father, if it be possible,
Let this cup pass from me.
Let Thy will be done."
|}

 Music 
The motet, a 22-bar Passion chorale in F minor. There are two settings: one for soloist and organ, and another for  choir a cappella.

As Crawford Howie writes "Both In jener letzten der Nächte WAB 17 (c. 1848) and Dir, Herr, dir will ich mich ergeben WAB 12 (c. 1845) for a cappella mixed-voice choir are chorale harmonizations, probably the result of [Bruckner's] studies with Zenetti."

 Selected discography 
The first recording of Bruckner's In jener letzten der Nächte was by Edith Möller, Obernkrichner Kinderchor, LP: Telefunken SLE 14391, 1965

A selection of the about 10 recordings:

 First setting 
 Wilfried Jochens (tenor), Werner Kaufmann (organ), Music of the St. Florian Period (Jürgen Jürgens) - LP: Jerusalem Records ATD 8503, 1984; transferred to CD BSVD-0109, 2011
 Sigrid Hagmüller (alto), Rupert Gottfried Frieberger (organ), Anton Bruckner – Oberösterreichische Kirchenmusik CD: Fabian Records CD 5112, 1995
 Ludmila Kuznetzova (mezzosoprano), Ludmila Golub (organ), Bruckner: Masses and Songs (Valeri Poliansky) - CD: Chandos CHAN 9863, 1998

 Second setting 
 Michael Stenov, Cantores Carmeli, Benefizkonzert Karmelitenkirche Linz - CD/DVD issued by the choir, 2006, and on YouTube.
 Rupert Gottfried Frieberger, Cantoria Plagensis, Anton Bruckner – Kirchenmusikalische Werke – Fabian Records CD 5115, 2007
 Thomas Kerbl, Chorvereinigung Bruckner 2011, Anton Bruckner|Lieder Magnificat - CD: Brucknerhaus LIVA 046, 2011
 Philipp von Steinäcker, Vocalensemble Musica Saeculorum, Bruckner: Pange lingua - Motetten - CD: Fra Bernardo FB 1501271, 2015

 Note 
 Frieberger's and Stenov's recordings contain both three strophes. The score used by Frieberger is coming from Reinthaler's Chorheft Bruckner, in which strophes 2 and 3 are originating from Brentano's Ausgewählte Gedichte. The score used by Stenov is coming from the religious songbook Unser Kirchenchorbuch für gemischte Stimmen.

 References 

 Sources 
 Anton Bruckner - Sämtliche Werke, Band XXI: Kleine Kirchenmusikwerke, Musikwissenschaftlicher Verlag der Internationalen Bruckner-Gesellschaft, Hans Bauernfeind and Leopold Nowak (Editor), Vienna, 1984/2001
 Cornelis van Zwol, Anton Bruckner 1824-1896 - Leven en werken, uitg. Thoth, Bussum, Netherlands, 2012. 
 Crawford Howie, Anton Bruckner - A documentary biography, online revised edition

 External links 
 In jener letzten der Nächte WAB 17 (1848) Critical discography by Hans Roelofs 
  - Both settings
  – Latin transcription as In monte Oliveti''
 A performance of the first setting can be heard on YouTube:  In jener letzten der Nächte, Robert Holzer, 2011
 A performance of the Latine transcription can be heard on YouTube: In monte Oliveti, Chor von St. Peter, Mannheim, 2011

Motets by Anton Bruckner
1848 compositions
Compositions in F minor